Tepidimonas ignava is a gram-negative, slightly thermophilic, motile bacterium with a single polar flagellum from the genus Tepidimonas, which was isolated from the hot spring at São Pedro do Sul in central Portugal.

References

External links
Type strain of Tepidimonas ignava at BacDive -  the Bacterial Diversity Metadatabase

Comamonadaceae
Bacteria described in 2000